Aristotelia chilensis, known as maqui or Chilean wineberry, is a tree species in the Elaeocarpaceae family native to South America in the Valdivian temperate rainforests of Chile and adjacent regions of southern Argentina. Limited numbers of these trees are cultivated in gardens for their small fruits. Wild-harvested fruits are commercially marketed.

Description

Tree
Aristotelia chilensis is a small dioecious evergreen tree that can reach  in height. Its divided trunk has a smooth bark. Its branches are abundant, thin and flexible. Its leaves are simple, opposite, hanging, oval-lanceolate, naked and coriaceous, with serrated edges. The leaf venation is highly visible, and the leaf stalk is a strong red color.

In the beginning of spring, the tree sheds the old leaf cohort, which is used as a carbohydrate source to form the new leaves and flowers.

Flowers and berries
When A. chilensis flowers at the end of spring, the white flowers are unisexual and small, eventually yielding a small edible fruit. With fruit that tastes similar to blackberries, the species is known as the Chilean wineberry, and locally in Spanish as maqui or maque.

Taxonomy 
The maqui was first scientifically described by Juan Ignacio Molina in 1782, who named it Cornus chilensis. In 1914, Stephen Conrad Stuntz assigned it to the genus Aristotelia that had been erected by Charles Louis L'Héritier de Brutelle in 1786, and made the new combination A. chilensis.

Distribution
Aristotelia chilensis is native to Chile and Argentina near the southwest coast of South America. It is found naturally in Chilean rainforests.

Ecology
Maqui berries are a favored food for birds at the end of summer. Deforestation of the Valdivian temperate rainforests in Chile suppresses seed dispersal by birds and leads to inbreeding depression.

Harvesting and cultivation
The berries of A. chilensis are collected from wild plants from December to March of each year by families, mainly Mapuche, who collect their harvest near the Andes Mountains. The harvesting process involves collecting the side branches of trees, shaking them to separate the berries and leaves from the branches, and then employing a mechanical process to separate the berries from the leaves.

Aristotelia chilensis is planted in home gardens and is not grown on an orchard scale. Most of the fruits on the market have been gathered from the wild. Maqui is frost sensitive and fairly tolerant of seaside conditions. It prefers a well-drained soil in full sun, with some protection against cold, drying winds. The soil should be slightly acidic, with moderate fertility.

Aristotelia chilensis can be planted in USDA zones 8 to 12. It is cultivated in Spain, and in milder, moister areas of Britain, where winter freezes cause dieback, thereby stimulating growth of more shoots in spring.

Propagation
Seeds of A. chilensis germinate without cold stratification. In zones with the possibility of frost, it is recommended to sow in spring in a greenhouse. If they have grown enough, by autumn, the new plants can be planted into individual pots . The potted plants should stay in the greenhouse for the first winter.

The following year, after the last expected frost in spring, the plants can be planted out into their final positions. In their first winter outdoors, some type of frost protection is required. For further propagation, vegetative propagation is possible: cuttings of wood with a length of  can be planted into pots. These cuttings normally root, and can be planted out in the following spring.

Anthocyanin content
Polyphenol research on maqui berries showed anthocyanin content to include eight glucoside pigments of delphinidin and cyanidin, with the principal anthocyanin being delphinidin 3-sambubioside-5-glucoside (34% of total anthocyanins). One study found that anthocyanins are also present in maqui leaves.

References

External links 

chilensis
Flora of Argentina
Flora of Chile
Trees of Chile
Berries
Fruits originating in South America
Dioecious plants
Flora of the Valdivian temperate rainforest